Alki Oroklini is a Cypriot football club based in Oroklini. The team was founded as Omonia Oroklinis in 1979. Omonia had one participation in the Fourth Division. In 2014 the team changed their name to Alki Oroklini, when business man Andy Loppas, who became the president of the team, renamed it to Alki as his favorite team was Alki Larnaca FC which was dissolved that year, due to financial problems. Alki managed the outstanding 3 promotions in 3 years from the fourth division to cypriot first division, the highest tier in Cyprus.

History

Omonia Oroklinis

Omonia Oroklinis founded at 1979. Until 2013, the team was a member of the local association, Free Area of Famagusta Football Association (POEPA). The season 2012–13, took part to the finals of the CFA Integration Championship. They lost to Enosis Kokkinotrimithia, but they won their promotion to the 2013–14 Cypriot Fourth Division and became a member team of the Cyprus Football Association (CFA). The team able to avoid relegation.
The team’s colors were the green and white. Team’s home ground was the Oroklini Community Stadium.

Rename to Alki Oroklini
On 10 April 2014, the team’s board of directors decided to rename the team to Alki Oroklini, when business man Andy Loppas, who became the president of the team, renamed it to Alki as his favorite team was Alki Larnaca FC which was dissolved that year, due to financial problems. The new president had a goal to promote the team to the Cypriot First Division. Alki Oroklini has no connection to Alki Larnaca, as the two teams never merged.

Alki Oroklini adopted the colors of Alki Larnaca (Blue and Red). The emblem of the team is similar to Alki Larnaca emblem. Furthermore, the nickname "Immortals" that was used as a nickname for Alki Larnaca is now being used for Alki Oroklini.

In the 2014–15 Cypriot Fourth Division season, Alki won the championship and promoted to the Cypriot Third Division. The next season, Alki took the second place of the league and was promoted to the Cypriot Second Division (they earned the same points with the champions team but they lost due to head-to-head records). Furthermore, they won the 2015–16 Cypriot Cup for lower divisions. At their first participation in the Second Division, the season 2016–17 Cypriot Second Division, the team won their promotion to the Cypriot First Division for the first time in their history, five rounds before the end of the championship. A few rounds later, they won the championship.

Home ground
Omonia Oroklinis home ground was the Oroklini Community Stadium. Alki Oroklini used that stadium for the first two seasons of their existence under that name. After they were promoted to the second division, they are using the Ammochostos Stadium.

Players

For recent transfers, see List of Cypriot football transfers summer 2021.

Out on loan

Technical and medical staff

Honours
 Cypriot Second Division
   Champions (1): 2016–17

 Cypriot Fourth Division
   Champions (1): 2014–15

 Cypriot Cup for lower divisions
 Winners (1): 2015–16

References

External reference

 Omonia Oroklinis at Cyprus Football Association website  
 Alki Oroklini at Cyprus Football Association website  

 
Football clubs in Cyprus
Association football clubs established in 1979
1979 establishments in Cyprus
Football clubs in Larnaca